
Dr. Shariaty Technical College (Danushgah-e Feni-ye Dâkter-e Shiri'ti) is the largest public all-purpose women-only college in Middle East that offers associate's and bachelor's degrees. It is located in the south of Tehran, Khani Abad, on the northern edge of the Azadegan expressway.

History
Shariaty Technical College was founded in November 1982 with former name Somaiyeh Technical Institute. The college admitted students in the fields of civil, architecture, machine design, electronics, laboratory science, computer, accounting, and technical vocational knowledge. In March 1983, Somaiyeh Institute started admitting students in the fields of commercial sewing, statistics, and then added electrical engineering field in February 1986. In October 1988, accounting was added to the disciplines and the number of students was increased from 60 to 300. By the end of the academic year 1988-89, the number of students reached 444 and 20 students were admitted to the chemical industry.

In 1989, the second branch of Somaiyeh College including educational centres, offices, and dormitories, with an area of approximately 9680 square meters, was opened near the Be'sat Highway (Kianshahr). In the academic year 1989-1990, the newly established educational institution admitted students in statistics, accounting, computer, electronics, design and sewing, and chemical industries.

At the beginning of the sixteenth anniversary of the Islamic Revolution, Tehran Girls Technical High Education College (Dr. Shariaty) with 507 students was established in the fields of architecture, electronics, statistics, computer, accounting, design, and sewing in Khani-Abad No with an area of 30 hectares.

In 1998, Dr. Shariaty Tehran Girls Technical Teacher Training College was approved by the Council of Universities Expansion and other officials in the Ministry of Education and in August 1999, Center 2 (Kianshahr) was independently approved as Vali-Asr Technical Institute.

In 2011 and the beginning of the fifth development plan in accordance with the Act of Islamic Consultative Assembly, Dr. Shariaty Tehran Girls Technical and Vocational College was separated from the Ministry of Education and joined the Ministry of Science, Research, and Technology as a Technical and Vocational College.

Schools 
 Electrical & Computer Engineering
 Art & Architecture
 Technical Science
 Administrative Science
 Sports Education
 Fashion and Textiles
 Core and General Science

See also
 Higher Education in Iran
 Universities in Iran
 Ali Shariati

External links
Shariaty Technical College

Universities in Tehran
Universities in Iran
1983 establishments in Iran
Technical and Vocational University campuses